Apollodotus I Prakrit in the Kharoshti script: maharajasa apaladatasa tratarasa) was an Indo-Greek king between 180 BC and 160 BC or between 174 and 165 BC (first dating Osmund Bopearachchi and R. C. Senior, second dating Boperachchi) who ruled the western and southern parts of the Indo-Greek kingdom, from Taxila in Punjab to the areas of Sindh and possibly Gujarat.

Ruler of the Indo-Greek kingdom
Apollodotus was not the first to strike bilingual coins outside Bactria, but he was the first king who ruled in India only, and therefore the founder of the proper Indo-Greek kingdom. According to W. W. Tarn, Apollodotus I was one of the generals of Demetrius I of Bactria, the Greco-Bactrian king who invaded northwestern India after 180 BC. Tarn was uncertain whether he was a member of the royal house. It is possible he was an illegitimate son of Euthydemus, making him Demetrius’ half brother. Later authors largely agree with Tarn's analysis, though with perhaps even more uncertainty regarding who the king was, for his coins do not give many hints.

Apollodotus was either succeeded in India by Antimachus II, or the two kings were contemporary, Antimachus II ruling the more western territories closer to Bactria. Eventually Apollodotus I was succeeded by Menander I, and the two kings are mentioned by Pompejus Trogus as important Indo-Greek rulers.

The 1st-2nd century AD Periplus of the Erythraean Sea further testifies to the reign of Apollodotus I and the influence of the Indo-Greeks in India:

Coinage

The coinage of Apollodotus is, together with that of Menander, one of the most abundant of the Indo-Greek kings. It is found mainly in the provinces of Punjab, Sindh and Gujarat, indicating the southern limit of the Indo-Greek expansion in India. This is also suggested by the Periplus, a 1st-century AD document on trade in the Indian Ocean, which describes the remnants of Greek presence (shrines, barracks, wells, coinage) in the strategic port of Barygaza (Bharuch) in Gujarat. Strabo (XI) also describes the occupation of Patalene (Indus Delta country). While Sindh may have come under his possession, it is not known whether Apollodotus advanced to Gujarat, where the Satavahanas ruled.

Apollodotus also issued a great number of bilingual Indian-standard square coins. Besides the usual royal title, the exact significance of the animals depicted on the coins is unclear. The sacred elephant may be the symbol of the city of Taxila, or possibly the symbol of the white elephant who reputedly entered the womb of the mother of the Buddha, Queen Maya, in a dream, which would make it a symbol of Buddhism, one of the main religions of the Indo-Greek territories.

Similarly, the sacred bull on the reverse may be a symbol of a city (Pushkhalavati), or a depiction of Shiva, making it a symbol of Hinduism, the other major religion at that time. The bull is often represented in a clearly erectile state, which reinforces its interpretation as a representation of Shiva. Conversely, this also reinforces the interpretation of the elephant as a religious symbol. Alternatively, the Bull, according to Foucher, represents the birth of the Buddha, as it happened during the month of Vaicakha (April–May), known to Buddhists as Vesak, under the zodiacal sign of the Taurus, during the full moon. The enlightenment and passing of the Buddha also occurred during the Taurus full moon.

Buddhist and Hindu symbolism

 
Before their design was eventually simplified, some of the earlier coins of king Apollodotus directly associate the elephant with Buddhist symbolism, such as the stupa hill (arched-hill symbol) surmounted by a crescent or a star (the Chaitya symbol), also seen, for example on the coins of the Mauryan Empire, many local coins of Taxila or those of the later Kuninda kingdom.

Also the zebu bull on the reverse is often shown with a nandipada taurine mark on its hump on the less-worn coins, which reinforces the role of the animal as a symbol, religious or geographic, rather than just the depiction of an animal for decorative purposes. The nandipada and the zebu bull are generally associated with Nandi, Shiva's humped bull in Hinduism. The same association was made later on coins of Zeionises or Vima Kadphises. The elephant, pendant to the bull, and shown with a girdle on the obverse, also must have a symbolic role, possibly Buddhism, as it was associated with the stupa hill in the earliest coins of Apollodotus. 
 
Apollodotus experimented with different coin standards for his silver, until he settled for a standard lighter than the Attic which would prevail for centuries, though later rulers usually struck round coins instead of the square (typically Indian) shape of most of Apollodotus' silver. He issued a number of bronzes with Apollo/tripod, that also were repeated for centuries.

Bactrian coins
Apollodotus also issued a small series of monolingual Attic tetradrachms, intended for export into Bactria. For these, Apollodotus I clearly used Bactrian celators to strike a realistic portrait of the king as an aged man in the Macedonian hat called kausia, with a reverse of sitting Pallas Athene holding Nike, a common Hellenistic motif introduced by the Diadoch Lysimachus. On these coins, he used no epithet.

See also
 Greco-Bactrian Kingdom
 Seleucid Empire
 Greco-Buddhism
 Indo-Scythians
 Indo-Parthian Kingdom
 Kushan Empire

References

Sources
Tarn, William Woodthorpe. The Greeks in Bactria and India. Cambridge University Press, 1938.

External links
Coins of Apollodotus
More coins of Apollodotus

Indo-Greek kings
2nd-century BC Indian monarchs
Year of birth unknown
160s BC deaths